The list of ship launches in 1713 includes a chronological list of some ships launched in 1713.


References

1713
Ship launches